The third season of the Pakistani music television series Coke Studio commenced airing on 1 June 2010 and ended on 31 July 2010.

Rohail Hyatt continued as the executive producer along with Umber Hyatt as the producer of the show. The production team included Naseer-ud-din Wasif as the technical manager, Zeeshan Parwez assisted by Adnan Malik on video production, Danial Hyatt on visual and animations and Selina Rashid with her firm Lotus as public relations.

Artists

Featured Artists 
The third season featured a return of Noori, Zeb and Haniya and Arieb Azhar, who were also part of second season of the show.

Abida Parveen
Amanat Ali
Arieb Azhar
Arif Lohar
Aunty Disco Project
Entity Paradigm
Fakir Juman Shah
Karavan
Meesha Shafi
Noori
Rizwan-Muazzam
Sanam Marvi
Tina Sani
Zeb and Haniya

Musicians 
The third season also saw a change in the house band as Natasha De Souza was replaced by Sanam Saeed and Zoe Viccaji whom joined Saba Shabbir on backing vocals.

Episodes
The third season featured five episodes which are titled as Reason, Will, Conception, Form and Realisation respectively; each episode with 5 songs, making a total of 25 songs. The show was produced at Rohail Hyatt's production company Frequency Media Pvt. Ltd and distributed by Coca-Cola Pakistan.

References

External links
 

Season03
2010 Pakistani television seasons